Geometrinae is the nominate subfamily of the geometer moth family (Geometridae). It is strongly split, containing a considerable number of tribes of which most are presently very small or monotypic. These small moths are often a light bluish green, leading to the common name of emerald moths, though a few species called thus are also found in the tribe Campaeini of the Ennominae. In 2018, a phylogeny and classification based on a molecular phylogenetic analysis was published in the Zoological Journal of the Linnean Society in which 13 tribes were accepted.

There are about 2,300 described species, mostly from the tropics.

Selected genera and species
 Blotched emerald, Comibaena bajularia
 Dysphania: the genus of 'false tiger moths' of Asia
 Large emerald, Geometra papilionaria
 Essex emerald, Thetidia smaragdaria

Genera incertae sedis
Some geometrine genera have not been definitely assigned to a tribe. These include:
 Bathycolpodes
 Bustilloxia
 Chlorodontopera
 Eucrostes
 Kuchleria
 Prosomphax
 Xenochlorodes
 Xenozancla

Footnotes

References

External links

 
Moth subfamilies